Maulana Mohammad Mujahid Khan Al Hussaini was a Pakistani Islamic scholar and politician who served as Member of Provincial Assembly of the Khyber Pakhtunkhwa from 2002 to 2007.

References

1920 births
2014 deaths
Pashtun people
Darul Uloom Deoband alumni
Pakistani Islamic religious leaders
Jamiat Ulema-e-Islam politicians
People from Nowshera District
Pakistani Sunni Muslim scholars of Islam
North-West Frontier Province MPAs 2002–2007
Deobandis